Amy Micallef (born 3 February 1998) is a Maltese swimmer. She competed in the women's 100 metre breaststroke event at the 2017 World Aquatics Championships.

References

1998 births
Living people
Maltese female swimmers
Place of birth missing (living people)
Female breaststroke swimmers